Perfect Nanny or The Perfect Nanny may refer to:

 The Perfect Nanny, an alternative title of the novel Lullaby by Leïla Slimani
 Perfect Nanny (film), a 2019 French film based on the novel
 "The Perfect Nanny" (song), a song from Walt Disney's 1964 film Mary Poppins